Chatswood High School is a government-funded co-educational bi-modal partially academically selective and comprehensive secondary day school, located in Chatswood, a suburb in the Lower North Shore of Sydney, New South Wales, Australia.

Established in 1959, the school caters to approximately 1,500 students from Year 7 to Year 12, especially known for its multicultural diversity with its connections to sister schools in Asia. Chatswood High School's campus is situated on extensive grounds at Centennial Avenue on the former Carr-Horden estate and is surrounded by remnant bushland.

History 
The school had a cadet unit in the early days - for boys only. Girls wore wide-brimmed straw hats and gloves.

In the late 1970s a number of demountable buildings were deployed to provide facilities for the school's Intensive English Centre, however, these demountables are no longer in use due to construction starting in early 2022. 

After a pilot Gifted and Talented program with the Year 7s of 2001, Chatswood High School established a selective stream in 2002, entrance to which is based upon the NSW Selective High Schools Test. Since then, Chatswood has steadily increased its secondary school ranking, reaching the top 85 with a rank of 82.

Chatswood is especially known for its work in the extracurricular field with achievements in the performing arts, NSW Law Society's Mock Trial Competition and with an array of leadership opportunities in the SRC and Prefect Body. The school's bands have had many successful overseas tours, including being the first Australian school Stage Band to be invited to the Montreux Jazz Festival in 1996. Chatswood High School's Concert Band 1 travelled to Europe in 2004 to the Vienna International Youth and Music Festival, attaining 2nd place. The musical 'Guys & Dolls' was put on in late June 2006 and the Band toured New Zealand, and again toured Europe in 2009. The tour in 2009 was to Vienna, Salzburg, St Moritz, Montreux and Paris.

Students have achieved particular successes in multimedia and digital media, with HSC practical works featured as state exemplars every year.

A two-storey specialised TAS block was completed in 2007.  The canteen was also refurbished in early 2009 and is now run by the P&C. The most recent change has been the complete refurbishment of the library and science area. This was officially opened at a special ceremony on 25 September 2009.

The school commemorated its 50th anniversary with a Festival Day on 25 September 2009. As part of this celebration, the school created a time capsule.

In 2012, a new multi-levelled administration and science block was opened as well as the refurbishment of a senior area, senior study room and a music extension to the existing school hall.

Marnie 
In 1990, Chatswood High School's  P & C purchased a country property for use as the school's Field Studies Centre. The property, Marnie, is a few kilometres from Rylstone, next to the Wollemi National Park. The property includes a cottage with accommodation for 10 people. It has served as a base for Duke of Edinburgh expeditions.

Sport and school partnerships 
Chatswood High School is also a member of the North Shore 5 (NS5) Secondary Schools partnership, a collaboration between: Killara High School, Ku-Ring-Gai Creative Arts High School, Saint Ives, and Turramurra High School. Chatswood sport runs within the North Shore region that encompasses Turramurra, Killara, Pennant Hills, Cherrybrook Technology, St Ives, Carlingford and Galston High School. Within this area and in regional and state competitions, Chatswood has experienced dominant successes in European Handball, Ultimate Frisbee and Football among the Kuringai zone.

Chatswood Education Precinct 
Planning went underway for a major redevelopment of the school, along with the nearby Chatswood Public School. Under the current proposal, new buildings will be constructed on both campuses, with some non-heritage buildings also being demolished and replaced. The IEC would also be set to move to St Ives High School. As of July 2022, The NSW Department of Planning, Industry & Environment has begun construction of the new buildings, with R block (near the front of the school, facing Centennial Avenue) having been completed earlier in 2022. The rest of the buildings are forecast to be completed in late 2023.

Notable alumni

Liam Burrows, musician and singer
Gia Carides, actor
Gordon McClymont , agricultural scientist
Carl Scully, former New South Wales Government minister
Mark Taylor, former captain of the Australian cricket team
Darren Percival, singer and performer
Altiyan Childs, singer/songwriter

See also 

 List of government schools in New South Wales
 List of selective high schools in New South Wales

References

Public high schools in Sydney
1959 establishments in Australia
Educational institutions established in 1959
Chatswood, New South Wales
School buildings completed in 1959
Selective schools in New South Wales